Clethrogyna aurolimbata is a species of moth of the family Erebidae first described by Achille Guenée in 1835. It is found in the Pyrenees and on the Iberian Peninsula. The larvae feed on Genista species, including Genista purgans. This species has commonly been placed in the genus Orgyia but molecular analyses support the genus Clethrogyna as a separate lineage.

References

External links

"10399 Orgyia aurolimbata (Guenée & De Villiers, 1835)". Lepiforum e V. Retrieved May 16, 2020.

Lymantriinae
Moths described in 1835
Moths of Europe
Taxa named by Achille Guenée